Lapsus$, stylised as LAPSUS$ and classified by Microsoft as DEV-0537, is an international extortion-focused hacker group known for its various cyberattacks against companies and government agencies.

Unlike most hacker groups, Lapsus$ is known for using the messaging app Telegram for communications to the public, including recruitment and posting sensitive data from their victims, although the group's usage of Telegram has diminished. The composition of the group has also been noted, with at least two of the members being teenagers. Lapsus$' attack vector is through social engineering; once the group has gained the credentials to a privileged employee within the target organisation, the group then attempts to obtain sensitive data through a variety of means, including using remote desktop tools.

The first major noted cyberattack attributed to Lapsus$ was against the Brazilian Health Ministry's computer systems in December 2021. In March 2022, Lapsus$ gained notoriety for a series of cyberattacks against large tech companies, including Microsoft, Nvidia, and Samsung. Following these attacks, the City of London Police announced that it had made seven arrests in connection to a police investigation into Lapsus$. Although the group had been considered inactive by April 2022, the group is believed to have re-emerged in September 2022 with a series of data breaches against various large companies through a similar attack vector, including Uber and Rockstar Games, with subsequent arrests again by City of London Police.

Attacks

Brazil's Ministry of Health (2021)
The first known cyberattack committed by Lapsus$ was against Brazil's Ministry of Health. The Ministry of Health website was taken down on Friday, 10 December around 1 AM. Lapsus$ left a message on the homepage of the website of the ministry ,,Contact us if you want your data back", apparently with 50 TB of data exfiltrated and deleted on internal servers.  In the message were also included their Telegram and e-mail addresses.  By Friday afternoon the message had been removed, but the website was still dysfunctional and user data in the ConectSUS app that provides Brazilians with Covid vaccination certificates had been deleted, causing disruption for travelers.

On October 19, 2022 a Brazilian citizen believed to be a Lapsus$ member was arrested by the police in Feira de Santana, Bahia and subsequently accused of the attack on the Brazil Ministry of Health and other cybercrimes after operation Dark cloud.  Lapsus$ attacks includes dozens of other targets from the Brazilian Federal Government bodies and entities, like the Ministry of Economy, the Comptroller General of the Union, and the Federal Highway Police. The data appears permanently deleted.

Okta (2022)
On 21 January 2022, Lapsus$ had gained access into the servers of identity and access management company Okta through the compromised account of a third-party customer support engineer. Okta confirmed the breach on 25 January 2022.Based on the final forensic report, Okta's Chief Security Officer David Bradbury said the attacker only accessed the two active customers. Okta began investigating claims of a hack after Lapsus$ shared screenshots in a Telegram channel implying they had breached Okta's customer networks. Initially, Okta said that a Lapsus$ hacker obtained Remote Desktop (RDP) access to a Sitel support engineer's laptop over "a five-day window" between January 16 and January 21.

Nvidia (2022)
On 23 February 2022, technology company Nvidia became aware of a breach into its systems. Lapsus$ claimed to have a terabyte of data from Nvidia, and threatened to release the "complete silicon, graphics, and computer chipset files for all recent NVIDIA GPUs, including the RTX 3090Ti and upcoming revisions" if Nvidia didn't open-source its device drivers. On 3 March, the credentials for Nvidia's over 71,000 employees emerged online.

Samsung (2022)
On 4 March 2022, Lapsus$ posted a 190 GB torrent to internal data belonging to phone manufacturer Samsung, including the source code of its Samsung Galaxy line of phones. Samsung confirmed the breach three days later.

Mercado Libre (2022)
On 8 March 2022, Argentinian e-commerce company Mercado Libre confirmed that user data for 300,000 customers had been accessed by Lapsus$; the group also claimed to have access to 24,000 repositories belonging to Mercado Libre.

Ubisoft (2022)
On 10 March 2022, gaming company Ubisoft confirmed that it had experienced a "cyber security incident", although user data had not been accessed.

T-Mobile (2022)
On 17 March 2022, Lapsus$ had gained access to an employee account within the telecommunications company T-Mobile. A prominent member of Lapsus$ going by the pseudonym "White" unsuccessfully attempted to gain access to the T-Mobile accounts of the Federal Bureau of Investigation and the United States Department of Defense. Lapsus$ was, however, able to obtain the source code repositories belonging to T-Mobile.

Microsoft (2022)
On 20 March 2022, Lapsus$ posted a screenshot of the technology company Microsoft's Azure DevOps server to their Telegram channel. The following day, the group released a 37 GB zip file containing, among other things, "90% of the source code for the Bing search engine".

Globant (2022)
On 30 March 2022, Luxembourg-based IT company Globant confirmed its network had been breached.

Uber (2022)
On 15 September 2022, nearly six months since Lapsus$' last attack, mobility as a service company Uber announced that it had been breached.

Rockstar Games (2022)

On 18 September 2022, 90 videos of game footage relating to an untitled Grand Theft Auto game emerged on GTAForums. The hacker is thought to have been affiliated with Lapsus$.

Interactions
The group used the messaging app Telegram, and the Lapsus$ Telegram channel was used to announce data dumps and to recruit accomplices. As of March 2022, it has nearly 50,000 subscribers. The group posted polls as to which organisation the group should target next.

The FBI made an appeal for information on 21 March 2022.

Composition
A Bloomberg report stated that the group's mastermind was a 16-year-old residing in Oxford, England, and another core member is a teenager in Brazil. The report also stated that the group has seven members and was likely formed recently.

Arrests
On 24 March 2022, seven people aged between 16 and 21 were arrested by the City of London Police in connection to a police investigation into Lapsus$. An alleged prominent member of the group with the pseudonym White was arrested in Oxford, England. His identity had allegedly previously been disclosed by a former associate, and various groups including research group Unit 221B were reported to have identified him. Two teenage members were charged on 1 April 2022.

Analysis
The group's assumed modus operandi was based on obtaining access to a victim organisation's corporate network by acquiring credentials from privileged employees. These credentials were acquired in a number of ways, including recruitment or hacking privileged employees using methods such as SIM swapping. Lapsus$ then used remote desktop or network access to obtain sensitive data, such as customer account details or source code. The group then extorted the victim organisation with threats of disclosing the data. In the conspicuous cases, the data was then subsequently released, and information posted on Telegram. 

Lapsus$ has used the social engineering tactic known as multi-factor authentication fatigue in its attack on Uber.

References

External links
 DEV-0537 - Krebs on Security

Hacker groups